John Nicoll may refer to:

John Nicoll (chronicler) (c.1590–1668), Scottish chronicler
John Cochran Nicoll (1793–1863), United States federal judge
John Allardyce Nicoll (1894–1976), British literary scholar and teacher
John Fearns Nicoll (1899-1981), British colonial governor
John Nicoll (MP), for Bodmin (UK Parliament constituency) 1402, 1425 and 1426

See also
Johnny Nicol, jazz singer
John Nichol (disambiguation)